Julien Benda (26 December 1867 – 7 June 1956) was a French philosopher and novelist, known as an essayist and cultural critic. He is best known for his short book, La Trahison des Clercs from 1927 (The Treason of the Intellectuals or The Betrayal by the Intellectuals).

Life 
Born into a Jewish family in Paris, Benda had a secular upbringing. He was educated at the Lycée Louis-le-Grand. After a period at the École Centrale Paris, he turned to history, and graduated at the Sorbonne in 1894.

His father's death in 1889 left Benda independently wealthy. He wrote for La Revue Blanche from 1891 to 1903. His articles on the Dreyfus affair were collected and published as Dialogues. He disagreed strongly with Henri Bergson, the leading light of French philosophy of his day, and launched an attack on him in 1911, when Bergson's reputation was at its height.

In July 1937 he attended the Second International Writers' Congress, the purpose of which was to discuss the attitude of intellectuals to the war in Spain, held in Valencia, Barcelona and Madrid and attended by many writers including André Malraux, Ernest Hemingway, Stephen Spender and Pablo Neruda.

Benda survived the German occupation of France and the Vichy regime 1940–1944, in Carcassonne. The journal of Jean Guéhenno described his life there, and his character: "Unbearable, yet likeable." He died in Fontenay-aux-Roses, on 7 June 1956.

Works
Benda is considered to be primarily an essayist. He was nominated for the Nobel Prize in Literature four times. His single nomination for the Goncourt Prize was in 1912 for L'Ordination. He lost out to André Savignon's novel Les filles de la pluie. Voting was tied, and the casting vote went to Léon Hennique, in a notorious election that caused Hennique to give up the presidency of the Académie Goncourt.

La Trahison des Clercs
Benda is now best remembered for his short 1927 book La Trahison des Clercs, a work of considerable influence. It was translated into English in 1928 by Richard Aldington; the U.S. edition was titled The Treason of the Intellectuals, while the British edition was titled The Great Betrayal. Aldington's translation was republished in 2006 as The Treason of the Intellectuals, with a new introduction by Roger Kimball. This polemical essay argued that European intellectuals in the 19th and 20th centuries had often lost the ability to reason dispassionately about political and military matters, instead becoming apologists for crass nationalism, warmongering, and racism. Benda reserved his harshest criticisms for his fellow Frenchmen Charles Maurras and Maurice Barrès. Benda defended the measured and dispassionate outlook of classical civilization and the internationalism of traditional Christianity.

Closing this work, Benda darkly predicts that the augmentation of the "realistic" impulse to domination of the material world, justified by intellectuals into an "integral realism," risked producing an all-encompassing species-wide civilization that would completely cease "to situate the good outside the real world." Human aspirations, specifically after power, would become the sole end of society. In closing, he concludes bitterly, "And History will smile to think that this is the species for which Socrates and Jesus Christ died."

Benda's word "clercs" was borrowed by Anne Appelbaum in her 2020 book Twilight of Democracy: The Seductive Lure of Authoritarianism.

Other works
Other works by Benda include Belphégor (1918), Uriel's Report (1926), and Exercises of a Man Buried Alive (1947), an attack on the contemporary French celebrities of his time. Most of the titles in the bibliography below were published during the last three decades of Benda's long life; he is emphatically a 20th-century author.

In his 1933 publication Discours à la nation européenne, Benda responded to Johann Gottlieb Fichte's Addresses to the German Nation.

Bibliography
 L'ordination – 1911
English translation, The yoke of pity, by Gilbert Cannan – 1913 
 Les sentiments de Critias – 1917
 Belphégor : essai sur l'esthétique de la présente société française – 1919
 Les amorandes – 1922
 La croix de roses ; précédé d'un dialogue d'Eleuthère avec l'auteur – 1923
 Lettres à Mélisande – 1926
 La trahison des clercs – 1927
 English translation,The Betrayal of the Intellectuals, by Richard Aldington:
 1955 (1928). Beacon Press. Introduction by Herbert Read.
 The Treason of the Intellectuals
 2006. Transaction Publishers. Introduction by Roger Kimball.
 Cléanthis ou du Beau et de l'actuel – 1928
 Properce, ou, Les amants de Tibur – 1928
 La Fin de l’Éternel – 1929
 Appositions – 1930
 Esquisse d'une histoire des Français dans leur volonté d'être une nation – 1932
 Discours à la nation européenne – 1933
 La jeunesse d'un clerc – 1936
 Précision (1930–1937) – 1937
 Un régulier dans le siècle – 1937
 Un Régulier dans le siècle (Paris, Gallimard) 1938
 La grande épreuve des démocraties : essai sur les principes démocratiques : leur nature, leur histoire, leur valeur philosophique. – 1942
 Exercice d'un enterré vif, juin 1940-août 1944 – 1945
 La France Byzantine, ou, Le triomphe de la littérature pure : Mallarmé, Gide, Proust, Valéry, Alain Giraudoux, Suarès, les Surréalistes : essai d'une psychologie originelle du littérateur – 1945
 Du poétique. Selon l'humanité, non-selon les poètes – 1946
 Non possumus. À propos d'une certaine poésie moderne – 1946
 Le rapport d'Uriel – 1946
 Tradition de l'existentialisme, ou, Les philosophies de la vie – 1947
 Du style d'idées : réflexions sur la pensée, sa nature, ses réalisations, sa valeur morale – 1948
 Trois idoles romantiques : le dynamisme, l'existentialisme, la dialectique matérialiste – 1948
 Les cahiers d'un clerc, 1936–1949 – 1949
 La crise du rationalisme – 1949

See also
 Notes on Nationalism, a 1945 essay by George Orwell dealing with similar themes as Benda's Trahison des Clercs.

References

Further reading 
 Nichols, Ray L., 1979. Treason, Tradition and the Intellectual: Julien Benda and Political Discourse.  Univ. Press of Kansas.
 Niess, Robert J., 1956. Julien Benda. Univ. of Michigan Press.

External links 
 

1867 births
1956 deaths
Writers from Paris
19th-century French Jews
20th-century French philosophers
French male non-fiction writers
Lycée Louis-le-Grand alumni